Tewodros Ashenafi (born 26 August 1969) is an Ethiopian entrepreneur. He currently serves as CEO of SouthWest Energy.

Education
Ashenafi holds a degree in Economics from Columbia College of Columbia University, where he studied under Professor Edmund Phelps. He graduated from Columbia in 1991. Ashenafi is an alumnus of Harvard Business School and attended the Owner Management Programme (OPM).

Career
Ashenafi is the Chairman of SouthWest Energy. He also serves as Chairman of SouthWest Development and Chairman of Ambo Mineral Water.

Ashenafi started his career at Merrill Lynch & Co in New York. Prior to founding SouthWest Energy in 2005, Mr. Ashenafi carried out international political and economic consulting work advising large international companies and pension funds about investment conditions in emerging markets, mainly in Latin America and the Commonwealth of Independent States.

In July 2016, Ashenafi played a key role in the privatization of Japan Tobacco International (with Ashenafi acting as the local partner) acquired 40% of Ethiopia’s National Tobacco Enterprise. The enterprise value of the deal was $1.4 billion, which is also one of largest private transactions in Africa.

In 2017, Forbes listed him as one of the richest men in Ethiopia.

Board memberships
Ashenafi is on the Board of Directors of EastWest Institute, a New York-based security think tank. He also sits on the International Advisory Board of the Atlantic Council, an organisation that promotes constructive leadership and engagement in international affairs. He is a member of the Advisory Board for Columbia University’s Africa Centre.

Awards and affiliations
Ashenafi was nominated as a Young Global Leader (YGL) in 2009 by the World Economic Forum, which recognizes the 200 most distinguished young leaders under the age of 40. He is also a member of Initiative for Global Development’s Frontier 100.

References

External links
World Economic Forum, Young Global Leaders http://www.weforum.org/young-global-leaders/tewodros-ashenafi/index.html,  https://web.archive.org/web/20121017211711/https://members.weforum.org/pdf/YGL/YGL2009_Honorees.pdf
http://www.atlanticcouncil.org/about/international-advisory-board

Living people
1969 births
Harvard Business School alumni
Columbia College (New York) alumni
Ethiopian expatriates in the United States
Ethiopian chief executives